Christopher "Brice" Wiggins is an American lawyer and politician. He serves as a Republican member of the Mississippi State Senate representing Mississippi's District 52, which includes the cities of Pascagoula and Ocean Springs.

Early life
Brice Wiggins was born on August 8, 1971, in Irving, Texas, the son of Linda (née Meredith), a teacher and librarian at Sacred Heart Elementary and Resurrection Schools in Pascagoula, and Dr. Christopher Edward Wiggins, an orthopedic surgeon. Wiggins is the great-grandson of Daisy Delmas and Ed Wiggins, mayor of Pascagoula from 1953 to 1957 and founder / owner of Wiggins Drugstores.

Wiggins was educated at the Pascagoula High School and graduated in 1989. He graduated from Tulane University in 1993. He received a Juris Doctor degree from the Mississippi College School of Law in 1998.

Career
Wiggins is an attorney with Taggart, Rimes & Wiggins, PLLC, in Pascagoula; where he handles general litigation, family law, corporate law, trucking litigation, and municipal court matters. He had his own firm, Wiggins Law, PLLC in Pascagoula from 2011 until 2021. He served as Assistant District Attorney and Youth Court Prosecutor in Jackson County, Mississippi for seven years prior to becoming a state senator in 2011.

Wiggins has served as a Republican member of the Mississippi State Senate since 2012, representing District 52, encompassing southern Jackson County and includes Pascagoula, Gautier, and Ocean Springs. As early as January 2012, he proposed a bill to prevent criminals convicted of manslaughter from being released early. After completing his first term, Wiggins ran unopposed in 2015. Tate Reeves named him Chairman of the first ever Senate Medicaid Committee, overseeing policy for one of the state’s largest budget items. In addition to serving on Appropriations, Education, and other committees, Wiggins serves as Vice-Chairman of the Senate Public Health Committee, one of the largest committees in the Senate. In a rare occurrence as a freshman legislator, Wiggins served as Chairman of the Senate Ports and Marine Resources Committee during his first term.

In his time in the Senate, Wiggins has authored and passed legislation strengthening Mississippi’s child abuse laws, including the “Lonnie Smith Act” which strengthened Mississippi’s child abuse laws, “Katie’s Law” allowing for the collection of DNA after arrest on violent felonies, increasing GPS monitoring of sex offenders, and increasing funding for prosecution of child abuse cases and handling the 2013 Criminal Justice Reform Act which strengthened laws against violent offenders, led to criminal justice reform throughout the state and is projected to save Mississippi taxpayers $210 million in correction costs.

Wiggins has been the lead author of two transformative pieces of legislation, the 2013 Early Learning Collaborative Act which established Mississippi’s first ever early education program. That program currently has 18 locations throughout the state and has transformed Mississippi from having no early childhood education programs to being in the top 5 in the United States.

As Chairman of Ports and Marine Resources and a freshman legislator, Brice secured $10 million for the expansion of the Port of Pascagoula.

In the wake of indictments of key Department of Marine Resources (DMR) officials, Wiggins has also authored and passed into law the DMR Accountability and Transparency Act in the wake of indictments of key DMR officials. Furthering his commitment to good government practices, Wiggins authored and passed, with the help Tate Reeves, legislation opening up the meetings of the state’s community hospitals and requiring them to be more transparent with their activities and documents.

Wiggins currently serves as Chairman of Judiciary A, a committee overseeing all manner of legal issues in the state and served as Chairman of Judiciary B in 2020 overseeing criminal law and criminal justice reform.

Political positions 
Wiggins is a leading advocate on education, government transparency, criminal justice reform, criminal prosecution issues and appropriations.

Following the BP Oil Spill, Wiggins fought to ensure federal and state dollars remained on the Gulf Coast. He was a lead Senate negotiator, as well as a lead appropriator, on the law creating the Gulf Coast Restoration Fund to direct hundreds of millions of dollars to the Gulf Coast and currently serves on the Governor’s Gulf Coast Advisory Committee for RESTORE Act funds.

Wiggins fights for several political positions, including:

 Cutting taxes and balancing the budget
 The importance of early education
 Economic recovery and resiliency
 Supporting law enforcement and fighting for impactful criminal justice reform
 Sustainable use of the environment and natural resources
 Promoting transparency and combating corruption
 Election reform
 Protecting the rights of the unborn
 Foreign policy
 Servant leadership
 Withdrawing from Afghanistan
 Supporting economic development
 Defending the Second Amendment
 Promoting public service to young people
 Increasing Mississippi's relevance
 Rightsizing the government and electing stronger congressional leadership
 Fighting the expansion of Obamacare
 Immigration
 Protecting and honoring veterans

Personal life
Wiggins is married to Heather Boyd. They have two children, Landon and Grace. They reside in Pascagoula, Mississippi. He is a member of the Eastlawn United Methodist Church, where he served as Administrative Council President from 2003 to 2004.

References

Living people
People from Irving, Texas
People from Pascagoula, Mississippi
Tulane University alumni
Mississippi College School of Law alumni
Mississippi lawyers
Republican Party Mississippi state senators
21st-century American politicians
1971 births
Candidates in the 2022 United States House of Representatives elections